Julien Loy (born 1 February 1976) is a French triathlete.

He won the gold medal at the 2007 ITU Long Distance Triathlon World Championships in Lorient, becoming the world champion and beating his fellow countrymen Xavier Le Floch and Sebastien Berlier, who finished second and third, respectively. He also won the gold medal at the 2008 ITU Long Distance Triathlon World Championships in Almere, Netherlands.

References

External links
Official website

1976 births
Living people
French male triathletes
21st-century French people
20th-century French people